The Revenge; Or, A Match In Newgate is a 1680 comedy play usually attributed to the English writer Aphra Behn. It was first performed by the Duke's Company at the Dorset Garden Theatre in London with a cast that included William Smith as Wellman, Joseph Williams as Friendly, John Bowman as Mr Shatter, Thomas Jevon as Trickwell, Anthony Leigh as  Mr Dashit, George Bright as Glisten, Elizabeth Barry as Corina, Charlotte Butler as Marinda, Emily Price as Diana, and Elinor Leigh as Mrs Dashit.

References

Bibliography
 Cox, Michael. The Concise Oxford Chronology of English Literature. Oxford University Press, 2005.
 Van Lennep, W. The London Stage, 1660-1800: Volume One, 1660-1700. Southern Illinois University Press, 1960.

1680 plays
West End plays
Plays by Aphra Behn
Restoration comedy